The Wuhan Ring Expressway, designated as G4201, is  in Wuhan, Hubei, China. The national motorway runs on parts of G4, G42, G50 and G70.

References

Chinese national-level expressways
Expressways in Hubei
Transport in Wuhan